Anita Höfer (born 1944) is a German film and television actress. She has also worked as a voice actress, dubbing foreign films for release in the German market.

Selected filmography
 Via Mala (1961)
 Black Gravel (1961)
 The Bird Seller (1962)
 Doctor Sibelius (1962)
 Only a Woman (1962)
 Situation Hopeless... But Not Serious (1965)
 Congress of Love (1966)
  (1968, TV film)
 Angry Harvest (1985)

References

Bibliography
 Peter Cowie & Derek Elley. World Filmography: 1967. Fairleigh Dickinson University Press, 1977.

External links

1944 births
Living people
German film actresses
German television actresses
Actresses from Stuttgart